R52 may refer to:

Roads 
 R52 expressway (Czech Republic), now the D52 motorway
 R52 (South Africa), a road

Other uses 
 , a destroyer of the Royal Navy
 Mini Cabrio (R52), a convertible
 Nissan Pathfinder (R52), a SUV
 R52: Harmful to aquatic organisms, a risk phrase